Birtley is a village in Northumberland, England southeast of Bellingham. It is about 10 miles (16 km) north of Hexham.

References

External links 

GENUKI (accessed: 3 December 2008)

Villages in Northumberland